Ernocornutia firna is a species of moth of the family Tortricidae. It is found in Cañar Province, Ecuador.

The wingspan is 20 mm. The ground colour of the forewings is brownish cream, but cream in the distal half of the wing along the edges. The hindwings are whitish cream and cream apically with grey spots.

References

Moths described in 2008
Euliini
Moths of South America
Taxa named by Józef Razowski